Browns Creek (also known as Brown's Creek) is a tributary of Huntsville Creek in Luzerne County, Pennsylvania, in the United States. The watershed is less developed than that of Toby Creek, but is beginning to urbanize. Wisconsinan Till, Wisconsinan Ice-Contact Stratified Drift, alluvium, sandstone and shale pits, and bedrock consisting of sandstone and shale all occur in the watershed.

Course
Browns Creek begins in a valley in Lehman Township, to the southwest of the Huntsville Reservoir. It flows south-southeast for more than a mile, entering Jackson Township, and its valley becomes slightly deeper. At the border of Chase, the creek turns east-northeast and begins flowing along the border. After several tenths of a mile, it receives an unnamed tributary from the left. A short distance further downstream, the creek turns east-southeast. It then turns east-northeast. After several tenths of a mile, it reaches its confluence with Huntsville Creek.

Hydrology
Browns Creek is not considered to be impaired.

The peak annual discharge of Browns Creek has a 10 percent chance of reaching 500 cubic feet per second. It has a 2 percent chance of reaching 850 cubic feet per second and a 1 percent chance of reaching 1030 cubic feet per second. The peak annual discharge has a 0.2 percent chance of reaching 1520 cubic feet per second.

Geography and geology

The surficial geology in the vicinity of Browns Creek mostly features a glacial or resedimented till known as the Wisconsinan Till and bedrock consisting of sandstone and shale. However, a large patch of Wisconsinan Ice-Contact Stratified Drift is situated near the creek's middle reaches. A few other small patches of it are located near the creek. Alluvium occurs along the creek in some places and there is a patch of sandstone and shale pits.

A feature identified by the Federal Emergency Management Agency as an obstruction occurs on Browns Creek in Jackson Township, near a private road.

Watershed
The creek is entirely within the United States Geological Survey quadrangle of Kingston.

The watershed of Browns Creek is less developed than the areas in the vicinity of the main stem of Toby Creek. However, the Browns Creek watershed is beginning to urbanize. There are several wetlands along the creek. A pond known as Beckers Pond is also in the watershed.

History
Browns Creek was entered into the Geographic Names Information System on August 2, 1979. Its identifier in the Geographic Names Information System is 1170385.

In 2000, as many as 5500 gallons of gasoline escaped from a ruptured pipeline in the vicinity of the watershed of Browns Creek. A total of three streams were affected by the gasoline leak: Browns Creek, a tributary of Browns Creek, and Huntsville Creek. Of these, Browns Creek was the second-most impacted stream. The most affected stream was the tributary of Browns Creek, where dead fish and aquatic wildlife were observed after the spill.

See also
List of rivers of Pennsylvania

References

Rivers of Luzerne County, Pennsylvania
Tributaries of the Susquehanna River
Rivers of Pennsylvania